Robert Leo Byrne (May 22, 1930 – December 6, 2016) was an American author and Billiard Congress of America Hall of Fame instructor of pool and carom billiards.

Early life and education
Robert Leo Byrne, son of Tom and Clara (Loes) Byrne, was born on May 22, 1930, and raised in Dubuque, Iowa. He attended St. Columbkille's elementary, Loras Academy, and Loras College.

He left Dubuque to attend Iowa State University, where his first sign of talent as a writer emerged as he edited a humor column in the school's newspaper. He transferred to University of Colorado, where he edited Flatiron, the school's humor publication, and he graduated in 1954 with a degree in civil engineering.

Byrne began his career in 1954 as a Junior Civil Engineer for the City and County of San Francisco, Department of Engineering, Bureau of Public Works, Division of Highways.

Writing career
In 1955, a year later, he found a way to combine his engineering and writing talents by joining Western Construction magazine as a reporter for the heavy construction industry. In 1961, he was named editor of the magazine, a position he held for over ten years.

Byrne became a full-time writer in 1977, after the publication of his third book. He authored seven novels, five collections of humorous quotations, seven books on billiards, two anthologies, and an exposé of frauds in the literary world. One of his novels, Thrill, was made into NBC’s Monday Night Movie, which aired for the first time on May 20, 1996. Four of his novels were selections of Reader's Digest Condensed Books and published in over a dozen languages.

Byrne's unusual mix of talents as a writer, engineer and billiard player formed the right skill set to create what would become one of the definitive instructional works on cue sports. Byrne’s Standard Book of Pool and Billiards, published in 1978 and expanded in 1998, has sold over 500,000 copies. It is one of the very few such works that includes diagrams that are mathematically and physically accurate, with lines plotting the path of the center of the balls; the lines, therefore, do not touch the cushions of the table. Byrne coined the pool jargon term "" in this book, defining the deflection effect that sends the  toward the right when struck with left , and vice versa.

Byrne's books, hundreds of instructional magazine articles, and seven instructional videos (shot on sound stages in Burbank and Hollywood, California), established him as the pre-eminent teacher and commentator in the world of pool and billiards. He was a columnist and Contributing Editor for Billiard Digest magazine from its first issue in 1978, and a columnist for Dubuque's Telegraph Herald beginning in 2000. His most recent publication is Behold My Shorts, the collection of a decade of his monthly newspaper columns.

In 1994, on Hilton Head Island, South Carolina, he received the Industry Service Award from the Billiard and Bowling Institute of America, an honor previously bestowed on Willie Mosconi, Paul Newman, and Jackie Gleason.  In 1998, the readers of Billiards Digest named Byrne "Best Billiards Writer". His contributions to billiards and pool were recognized with induction into the Billiard Congress of America's Hall of Fame. The honor, perhaps the greatest in the field, was bestowed for Meritorious Service on July 21, 2001, at the Las Vegas Hilton, at a banquet closing the annual International Billiard & Home Recreation Expo. He was inducted with many-time World Three-cushion Billiards Champion Raymond Ceulemans of Belgium.

As of May 2011, he had nearly finished a new collection of humorous quotations.

Playing career 
Byrne's first success as a pool hustler came at the age of 12 when he beat the gas-meter reader out of 85¢, playing 8-ball on his family's basement pool table.

As a player, he had success at U.S. national-class tournaments in multiple disciplines:
 Champion, National Senior Billiard Tournament, 1999
 Champion, National Amateur Athletic Club Billiards Tournament, 1999
 Third place, National Professional Three-Cushion Championship, 1977
 Fourth place, National Professional Three-Cushion Championship, 1968

Byrne performed the pool trick shots for The Young Indiana Jones Chronicles in 1993.

He had a three-cushion billiards  of 14, at age 29 and again at 79.  The last time he ran his age in straight pool was at age 78.

Personal life
On May 12, 1958, Byrne married Josefa Heifetz, concert pianist and daughter of legendary violinist Jascha Heifetz. On May 16, 1962, Josefa gave birth to Russell Heifetz Byrne, their only child, who now works as a network consulting engineer for Cisco Systems. Byrne and Heifetz were divorced in 1976. On May 9, 1991, Byrne married Cynthia "Cindy" Nelms, a graphic artist and painter.

After living in California for nearly 40 years, Byrne moved back to his childhood home of Dubuque, Iowa, with Cindy in 1996. Byrne's civic involvement in Dubuque included serving as president of the Friends of Wahlert Library, Loras College, and as a board member of both the Dubuque Symphony Orchestra and Dubuque Museum of Art.

Byrne was an amateur stage magician, a member of the International Brotherhood of Magicians, and had published tricks in Genie magazine. He was once a Class A tournament chess player, with a United States Chess Federation rating over 1800.

He died on December 6, 2016, of natural causes.

Works

Pool and billiards books 
 McGoorty, The Story of a Billiard Bum, 1972, Lyle Stuart (hardcover); republished 1984, as McGoorty, A Billiard Hustler's Life, Citadel Press, (hardcover); republished again 2004, as McGoorty, A Pool Room Hustler, Broadway Books (paperback)
 Byrne's Standard Book of Pool and Billiards, 1978, Harcourt Brace & Jovanovich (hardcover), 1987 (paperback)
 Byrne's Treasury of Trick Shots in Pool and Billiards, 1982, Harcourt Brace/Harvest (paperback); 1983, Mariner (paperback); 1984, Houghton Mifflin Harcourt Press (hardcover)
 Byrne's Advanced Technique in Pool and Billiards, 1990, Houghton Mifflin Harcourt Press (hardcover), Harcourt Brace (paperback)
 Byrne's Book of Great Pool Stories, 1995, Harcourt Brace
 Byrne's Wonderful World of Pool and Billiards, 1996, Harcourt Brace
 Byrne's New Standard Book of Pool and Billiards, 1998, Harcourt Brace
 Byrne's Complete Book of Pool Shots: 350 Moves Every Player Should Know, 2003, Harcourt/Harvest Books

Instructional videos 

 Byrne's Standard Video of Pool, Volume I, 1987, Premiere Home Video
 Byrne's Standard Video of Pool, Volume II, 1988, Premiere Home Video
 Byrne's Standard Video of Trick Shots, Volume III, 1993, Premiere Home Video
 Byrne's Standard Video of More Trick Shots, Volume IV, 1993, Premiere Home Video
 Byrne's Power Pool Workout, Volume V, 1996, Premiere Home Video
 Byrne's Rack 'Em Up!, 1996, Premiere Home Video
 Byrne's Gamebreakers, 2002, Accu-Stats Video Productions

Billiard tournament commentary videos 
 The Best of Three Cushion Billiards, Volume I, 1995, Accu-Stats Video Productions
 The Best of Three Cushion Billiards, Volume II, 1997, Accu-Stats Video Productions

Novels 
 Memories of a Non-Jewish Childhood, 1970, Lyle Stuart (hardcover); 1972, New American Library (paperback) Staged as a musical by Dubuque's Grand Opera House in 2005.
 Once a Catholic, 1981m New American Library (paperback)
 The Tunnel, 1977, Harcourt Brace & Jovanovich. Selected for inclusion in a volume of Reader's Digest Condensed Books in 1977
 The Dam, 1981, Atheneum. Part of Reader's Digest Condensed Books #136, 1981, vol. 3
 Always a Catholic, 1981, Pinnacle
 Skyscraper, 1984, Atheneum. Part of Reader's Digest Condensed Books #154, 1984, vol. 3
 Mannequin, 1988, Atheneum. Included under the title Death Train in Reader's Digest Condensed Books #180, 1988, vol. 5
 Thrill, 1995, Carrol & Graf

Collections of quotations 
 The 637 Best Things Anybody Ever Said, 1983, Fawcett
 The Other 637 Best Things Anybody Ever Said, 1985, Fawcett
 The Third and Possibly the Best, 637 Best Things Anybody Ever Said, 1986, Ballantine Books
 The 1911 Best Things Anybody Ever Said, 1988, Fawcett/Columbine. Collection of the first three volumes.
 The Fourth and by Far the Most Recent 637 Best Things Anybody Ever Said, 1990, Fawcett
 The Fifth and Far Finer than the First Four 637 Best Things Anybody Ever Said, 1994, Crest
 The 2548 Best Things Anybody Ever Said, 1996, Budget Book Service; 2001, Galahad (hardcover); 2002, Fireside (paperback); 2006, Simon & Schuster (hardcover).  Collection of the first four volumes.

Other books 
 Writing Rackets, 1969, Lyle Stuart
 Cat Scan: All the Best from the Literature of Cats, 1983, Scribner
 Every Day is Father's Day, 1990, Crest
 Behold My Shorts, 2009, Telegraph Herald

As editor 
 Heifetz-Byrne, Josefa. Mrs. Byrne's Dictionary of Unusual, Obscure, and Preposterous Words, Gathered from Many and Diverse Authoritative Sources, 1974, University Press
 Kruse, Len. My Old Dubuque: Collected Writings on Dubuque Area History, 2000, Loras College Center for Dubuque History

Notes

References

External links 

 Robert Byrne's official website, Byrne's Books & Billiards Billiards Digest magazine website, with Byrne columns

1930 births
2016 deaths
20th-century American novelists
20th-century American male writers
American book editors
American carom billiards players
American male novelists
American pool players

Cue sports writers and broadcasters
Pool writers and broadcasters
Writers from Dubuque, Iowa
Writers from California
University of Colorado Boulder alumni
Novelists from Iowa